The 1964 Soviet football championship was the 32nd seasons of competitive football in the Soviet Union and the 26th among teams of sports societies and factories. Dinamo Tbilisi won the championship becoming the Soviet domestic champions for the first time.

Honours

Notes = Number in parentheses is the times that club has won that honour. * indicates new record for competition

Soviet Union football championship

Class A First Group

Class A Second Group

For places 1-14

For places 15-27

Class B

Russian Federation finals
 [Nov 9–17, Orjonikidze]

Additional final
 RostSelMash Rostov-na-Donu  2-0  Terek Grozny

Ukraine (playoffs)

This season to the Ukrainian zone were added four teams from Belarus and three teams from Moldova. SKA Odessa did not participate as it gained its promotion last season. Two other newcomers were added: FC Chayka Balaklava and FC Dunayets Izmail.

This season play-off featured a mini League format. The two successive ranking teams from one group were put together in group with the other two teams from other two groups of equal rank. For example, the first two placed teams of each group played off between themselves for the final ranking. Teams from Belarus and Moldova did not participate at this stage.

Second stage for places 1-6

Second stage for places 7-12

Union republics finals
 [Oct 18–28, Klaipeda]

Additional final
 [Nov 1, Kaliningrad]
 Granitas Klaipeda  2-0 Vostok Ust-Kamenogorsk

Top goalscorers

Class A First Group
Vladimir Fedotov (CSKA Moscow) – 16 goals

References

External links
 1964 Soviet football championship. RSSSF